Nikolay Aleksandrovich Maysuryan (November 11, 1896 in Tbilisi - November 22, 1967 in Tbilisi) was a Soviet scientist, Academician of the VASKhNIL (since 1958) and Correspondent Member of the Armenian National Academy of Sciences (since 1945), Doktor Nauk in Agricultural Sciences (1944) and Professor at the Russian State Agrarian University - Moscow Timiryazev Agricultural Academy.

He graduated from the Georgian Technical University in 1922.
He was a student of Dmitry Pryanishnikov.

In 1934 he received the title of Professor.

From 1941 to 1961, Professor Maysuryan served as the Dean of the Faculty of Agronomy of the Moscow Timiryazev Agricultural Academy.

From 1958 to 1967, Professor Maysuryan headed the Department of Horticulture at the Moscow Timiryazev Agricultural Academy.

Member of the Communist Party of the Soviet Union since 1953.

He was awarded:

Order of Lenin (1953, 1965)
Order of the Red Banner of Labour (1945)

Professor Maysuryan is the author about of 300 scientific papers.

His grandson Alexander Maysuryan is a Russian author.

References

Sources 
 http://www.cnshb.ru/AKDiL/akad/base/RM/000514.shtm

Soviet professors
Academicians of the VASKhNIL
Communist Party of the Soviet Union members
Recipients of the Order of Lenin
Scientists from Tbilisi